Gunderman is a locality of the Central Coast region of New South Wales, Australia, located on the north bank of the Hawkesbury River between the towns of Wisemans Ferry and Spencer. It is located within the  local government area. It adjoins the Dharug National Park. At the 2006 census, Gunderman had a population of 137 people.

Gunderman is derived from an aboriginal word meaning 'house by the stream'.

Heritage listings
Gunderman has a number of heritage-listed sites, including:
 Wisemans Ferry Road: Lower Hawkesbury Wesleyan Chapel

References

Suburbs of the Central Coast (New South Wales)
Hawkesbury River